The Falls City School House is a historic schoolhouse located  south and  east of Jerome, Idaho. The schoolhouse was built by stonemason H.T. Pugh in 1919; it is one of four schoolhouses built by Pugh. The one-story building has a hipped roof with overhanging eaves. A stone false front over the entrance has a segmental arch and a concrete panel with the school's name. Pugh used concrete blocks, which he made on site, to accent the entrance and the corners of the building. The schoolhouse served Falls City School District 36 until it closed in the 1960s.

The schoolhouse was listed on the National Register of Historic Places in 1983.

References

See also

 List of National Historic Landmarks in Idaho
 National Register of Historic Places listings in Jerome County, Idaho

1919 establishments in Idaho
Buildings and structures in Jerome County, Idaho
School buildings completed in 1919
School buildings on the National Register of Historic Places in Idaho
National Register of Historic Places in Jerome County, Idaho